Shorncliffe Camp can refer to:

 Shorncliffe Redoubt – a British Napoleonic earthwork fort
 Shorncliffe Army Camp – a large military establishment in Cheriton, Kent, UK
 Folkestone West railway station – a British railway station opened in 1863 as "Shorncliffe Camp"